Ancestral houses of the Philippines or Heritage Houses are homes owned and preserved by the same family for several generations as part of the Filipino family culture.  It corresponds to long tradition by Filipino people of venerating Ancestors and Elders. Houses could be a simple house to a mansion. The most common ones are the "Bahay na Bato". Some houses of prominent families had become points of interest or museums in their community because of its cultural, architectural or historical significance.  These houses that are deemed of significant importance to the Filipino culture are declared Heritage House by the National Historical Commission of the Philippines (NHCP), previously known as the National Historical Institute (NHI) of the Philippines.  Preservation is of utmost importance as some ancestral houses have come into danger due to business people who buy old houses in the provinces, dismantle them then sell the parts as ancestral building materials for homeowners wishing to have the ancestral ambiance on their houses.  These ancestral houses provide the current generation a look back of the country's colonial past through these old houses.

National Cultural Heritage Act of 2009

In 2009, the Congress of the Philippines passed the National Cultural Heritage Act of 2009 or Republic Act. no. 10066 to further the protection the cultural treasures of the country which include houses under Built heritage.  Ancestral houses that are declared Heritage House by the NHCP are still owned by their owners.  The government is only declaring the heritage value of the structure, provide funding for its protection and preservation.   Ancestral homes that have figured in an event of historical significance like the Bonifacio Trial House in Maragondon, Cavite, or houses of national heroes of the Philippines like the Juan Luna Shrine in Badoc, Ilocos Norte are included among the categories National Shrines or National Historical Landmarks.  Historical markers are placed on the houses by the commission to indicate their significance.  The Philippine Registry of Cultural Property registers all cultural properties of the country.

List of Heritage Houses of the Philippines
Partial list of ancestral houses declared as Heritage Houses by the NHCP, some with declaration dates, grouped according to the regions in the country. many are of Bahay Na Bato architecture.

Region I

In the Ilocos Region the historic city of Vigan is the best preserved Spanish Colonial settlement in the country. It was declared as a UNESCO World Heritage Site in 1999.
 Syquia Mansion in Vigan, Ilocos Sur, home of former president Elpidio Quirino

Region III

In Central Luzon, There are two historical town centers declared by National Historical Commission of the Philippines as historic town centers in the region namely the Malolos Heritage Town in Bulacan declared on August 15, 2001, and City of San Fernando Heritage District in Pampanga declared in 2004.
Malolos Heritage Town NHL
 Doña Alberta Uitancoy Mansion, Calle FT Reyes, Malolos, Bulacan
 Don Hermogenes Reyes Mansion, Calle FT Reyes, Malolos, Bulacan
 Gobierno Militar de la Plaza, Calle Pariancillo, Malolos, Bulacan now Meralco Malolos Office.
 Don Antonio Bautista Mansion, Calle Paseo del Congreso, Malolos, Bulacan oldest house existing in Malolos.
 Don Jose Bautista Mansion, Calle Sto Niño, Malolos, Bulacan
 Don Ramon Gonzales de Leon House, Calle Cigarillera, Malolos, Bulacan
 DR.Luis Uitangcoy Santos Mansion, Calle FT Reyes, Malolos, Bulacan
 Guillermo E.Tolentino House, Calle Sabitan, Malolos, Bulacan with NHCP marker.
 Don Arcadio Ejercito Mansion, Calle Pariancillo, Malolos, Bulacan
 Don Erastro Cervantes House, also known as Secretaria de Guera, Calle Pariancillo, Malolos, Bulacan
 Don Jose Chichioco-Cojuangco Mansion, Calle Paseo del Congreso, Malolos, Bulacan with NHCP marker.
 Don Fausto Chiong Mansion, Calle Pariancillo, Malolos, Bulacan
  Mariano Crisostomo, Calle Estrella, Malolos, Bulacan Don Mariano is uncle of Marcelo H.Del Pilar.
 Pineda House, Calle Jarino, Malolos, Bulacan
 1930 Lomotan-Jacinto, Calle Sto Nino, Malolos, Bulacan

San Fernando Heritage Zone
San Fernando, Pampanga
 Augusto P. Hizon House in San Fernando, Pampanga
 Dayrit-Cuyugan House in San Fernando, Pampanga (2003-01-27)
 Henson-Hizon House in San Fernando, Pampanga (2003-01-27)
 Hizon-Singian House in San Fernando, Pampanga (2003-01-27)
 Lazatin House in San Fernando, Pampanga (2003-01-27)

National Capital Region
The central part of Metro Manila was heavily bombed in World War II destroying historical structures and homes.  Somes pockets of old homes can still be found in Binondo and Quiapo which were not affected by the war.

 Bahay Nakpil-Bautista in Quiapo, Manila
 Casa Consulado in Quiapo, Manila
 Lichauco Residence in Santa Ana, Manila
 Mira-Nila House Cubao, Quezon City
 Quezon Heritage House in New Manila, Quezon City

Region IV-A
In the Calabarzon region, the center for ancestral houses can be found in the streets of Taal, Balayan, and Calaca, in Batangas and Sariaya in Quezon provinces. The town center of Pila, Laguna, with its Spanish and American-era houses, was declared a National Historical Landmark in 2000.

 Gala-Rodriguez House in Sariaya, Quezon
 Natalio Enriquez House in Sariaya, Quezon
 Don Catalino Rodriguez Ancestral House in Sariaya
 Acosta-Pastor Ancestral House in Batangas City
 Luz-Katigbak House in Lipa, Batangas
 Sarayba House in General Trias, Cavite
 Goco House in Taal, Batangas
 Ylagan-de la Rosa House in Taal, Batangas
 Bahay na Bato Oleta Family in Pililla, Rizal

Region IV-B
Declared Heritage House in Mimaropa region.
 Casa Narvas in Boac, Marinduque, Marinduque

Region V

In Tabaco City, the Manalang Gloria ancestral house, formerly the Smith, Bell and Company House, is a prominent heritage house.

In San Pascual, Masbate, the ancestral house of Lazaro family is the oldest existing and the biggest house.

Region VI 
The Western Visayas region contains the largest number of ancestral homes in the Philippines.

Bacolod
 Generoso Villanueva House, known as "Daku Balay" (Big House), is one of the finest examples of Art Deco architecture in the Philippines from the 1930s.
 Mariano Ramos Ancestral House

Iloilo City 
Iloilo City is known as the "City of Mansions", having the most number of Heritage Mansions in the country.

 Arroyo House in Iloilo City Proper
 Camiña Balay nga Bato in Arevalo
 Casa Mariquit in Jaro
 Casa Rizaliana in Molo
 Celso Ledesma Mansion in Iloilo City Proper
 Concepcion Chalet in Jaro
 Don Roque Locsin Sanson Mansion in Molo
 Eusebio Villanueva Mansion, formerly known as Don Julio Ledesma House, in Iloilo City Proper
 Joaquin Ledesma Mansion in Jaro
 Juan Ledesma Mansion in Iloilo City Proper
 Kilayko Mansion in Iloilo City Proper
 Lizares Mansion in Jaro
 Locsin Ancestral House in Molo
 Lopez Boat House in La Paz
 Lopez-Vito Mansion in Jaro
 Loring House in Iloilo City Proper
 Magdalena Jalandoni House in Jaro
 Mansion de Lopez (Nelly's Garden) in Jaro, considered as the "Queen of Heritage Houses in Iloilo"
 Montinola-Jaen House in Jaro
 Pison Ancestral House in Molo
 Rosendo Mejica House in Molo
 Sanson y Montinola Mansion in Jaro
 Sinamay House in Arevalo
 Yusay-Consing Mansion, popularly known as Molo Mansion, in Molo

Roxas City 
 Laserna House
 Pres. Manuel A. Roxas Ancestral House

Silay City

Silay City in Negros Occidental has the most number of declared Heritage Houses in the country.
 Alejandro Amechazura House
 Amelia Hilado Flores House
 Angel Araneta Ledesma House
 Augusto Hilado Severino House
 Benita Jara House
 Bernardino Lopez Jalandoni Ancestral House
 Carlos Arceo Ledesma House
 Claudio Hilado Akol House
 Delfin Ledesma House
 Digna Locsin Consing House
 Dr. Jose Corteza Locsin Ancestral house
 Felix Tad-y Lacson House
 Generoso Reyes Gamboa House
 German Lacson Gaston House
 German Locsin Unson House
 Jose Benedicto Gamboa House
 Jose Corteza Locsin House
 Jose Ledesma House
 Kapitan Marciano Montelibano Lacson House
 Manuel de la Rama Locsin House
 Manuel Severino Hofileña House
 Maria Ledesma Golez House
 Modesto Ramirez Hojilla (Carlos Javelosa Jalandoni) House
 Severino Building/Heritage House
 Soledad and Maria Montelibano Lacson House
 Teodoro Morada House
 Vicente Conlu Montelibano House
 Victor Fernandez Gaston House or Balay Negrense

Talisay City 
 Mariano Ledesma Lacson known as The Ruins (mansion) is the remains of the ancestral home mansion. The mansion was built in early 1900s and inspired by Italian architecture.
 General Aniceto Lacson house in Hda. Matab-ang, is a fine example of a bahay na bato built in the 1880s that has a balcony that wraps around the entire 2nd floor giving a panoramic view of the surrounding hacienda as well as having its own chapel at ground level.

Other Heritage Houses in Region VI
 Infante House in La Carlota City, Negros Occidental
 Roca Encantada House in Buenavista, Guimaras

Region VII
Heritage Houses in Central Visayas region:

 Don Vicente H. Garces Ancestral House in Talisay City, Cebu
 Balay na Tisa Heritage House in Carcar, Cebu
 Clarin Ancestral House in Loay, Bohol
 Mercado Mansion in Carcar, Cebu
 President Carlos P. Garcia Heritage House in Tagbilaran, Bohol
 Sa Dakong Balay / Don Florencio Noel House in Carcar, Cebu
 Yap-Sandiego Heritage House in Cebu City
 Silva House in Carcar, Cebu

 German Ferraren y Geronimo Ancestral House in Ginatilan, Cebu
 Ferolin Ancestral House in Ginatilan, Cebu

Region VIII
Heritage Houses in the Eastern Visayas region:
 Oppus Ancestral House now the Southern Leyte Provincial Library in Maasin, Southern Leyte

Region X
Heritage Houses in the Northern Mindanao region:
 Macapagal-Macaraeg House in Iligan City, Lanao del Norte

National Shrines and National Historical Landmarks
Partial list of ancestral houses declared as National Shrine or National Historical Landmark by the NHCP:
 Aguinaldo Shrine in Kawit, Cavite
 Apolinario Mabini Shine in Tanuan, Batangas
 Apolinario Mabini Shrine in Pandacan, Manila
 Aquino Ancestral House Historical Landmark in Concepcion, Tarlac
 Baldomero Aguinaldo Shrine in Binakayan, Kawit, Cavite
 Juan Luna Shrine in Badoc, Ilocos Norte
 Marcela Agoncillo Historical Landmark in Taal, Batangas
 Marcelo H. del Pilar Shrine in Bulakan, Bulacan
 Rizal Shrine, Calamba, Laguna
 Rizal Shrine in Dapitan, Zamboanga del Norte
 Santa Barbara Church and Convent in Santa Barbara, Iloilo

Other ancestral houses
 Consunji House in San Fernando, Pampanga
 Mariano Ramos Ancestral House in San Fernando, Pampanga
 Quema House in Vigan, Ilocos Sur
 Tabacalera House in San Fernando, Pampanga
 Atega Ancestral House in Cabadbaran City, Agusan del Norte
 Villavicencio's Ancestral and the Wedding Gift House in Taal, Batangas
 Casa Bernedo in Dipolog, Zamboanga del Norte

References

External links
 Partial list of Philippine Registry of Cultural Property under Built Heritage
 Other Ancestral houses from the Historical Conservation Society.

Houses in the Philippines

Architecture in the Philippines